Richard Mellon may refer to:

 Richard B. Mellon (1858–1933), American banker, industrialist, and philanthropist
 Richard King Mellon (1899–1970), American financier, general, and philanthropist